Stephen Carson (born 6 October 1980) is a former footballer, who is now director of coaching at FC Westchester.

Career
Carson started his senior career in the Scottish Premier League with Rangers. After only a handful of first team appearances, he moved to Dundee United in August 2001 for a transfer fee of £150,000, but he struggled to command a regular place in the team. After leaving United in 2003, Carson had brief spells with Barnsley and Hartlepool United prior to his return to Northern Ireland to join the club he supported as a boy, Coleraine. Stephen Carson is also Youth development officer at Coleraine.

In May 2009, he received his first call-up to the Northern Ireland squad for the friendly against Italy on 6 June. He won his first international cap with a start in against the Azzurri in Pisa.

In July 2009 it was reported on the BBC Sport website that Carson was in talks with A-League side Newcastle United Jets FC about a possible transfer. Carson went on a trial in Australia but the transfer did not take place.

Carson revealed on 11 April 2011, that he would be leaving Coleraine to join Glentoran at the end of the 2010–2011 season. He would later go on to win the Irish League Cup with the side in 2012 and the Irish Cup a year later.
After two seasons in total, however, Carson returned to his boyhood favourites, Coleraine FC, where he resumed the position of winger. He retired in January 2014 to take up a coaching role in New York with Everton FC Westchester.

Career statistics
British stats only:

References

External links
 (Scottish clubs)
 (English clubs)

1980 births
Living people
Association footballers from Northern Ireland
Northern Ireland international footballers
Rangers F.C. players
Dundee United F.C. players
Barnsley F.C. players
Hartlepool United F.C. players
Coleraine F.C. players
Scottish Premier League players
Northern Ireland under-21 international footballers
People from Ballymoney
Glentoran F.C. players
Association football wingers